Highway Amazon is a 2001 documentary film directed by Ronnie Cramer. It chronicles the life of body builder Christine Fetzer, as she travels across the United States wrestling men in hotel rooms. During the course of the film, Fetzer reminisces about her former career as an exotic dancer  and is shown lifting weights and engaging in several erotic wrestling matches, as well as indulging her clients in muscle worship. Highway Amazon was named Best Documentary at the Humboldt Film Festival in Arcata, California.

References

External links
 

2001 films
2000s English-language films